Temognatha is a genus of metallic wood-boring beetles. Over 85 species in the genus are native to Australia.

Species
Species include:
 Temognatha aestimata (Kerremans, 1898)
 Temognatha affinis (Saunders, 1868)
 Temognatha alternata (Lumholtz, 1889)
 Temognatha apicenigra (Théry, 1937)
 Temognatha aquilonia Peterson, 1991
 Temognatha barbiventris (Carter, 1916)
 Temognatha bonvouloirii (Saunders, 1868)
 Temognatha bruckii (Thomson, 1878)
 Temognatha carinicollis (Théry, 1937)
 Temognatha carpentariae (Blackburn, 1892)
 Temognatha chalcodera (Thomson, 1878)
 Temognatha chevrolatii Géhin, 1855
 Temognatha coelestis (Thomson, 1857)
 Temognatha congener (Saunders, 1869)
 Temognatha conspicillata (White, 1843)
 Temognatha coronata (Peterson, 1982)
 Temognatha donovani (Gory & Laporte, 1838)
 Temognatha duboulayi (Saunders, 1872)
 Temognatha ducalis (Carter, 1927)
 Temognatha duponti (Boisduval, 1835)
 Temognatha excisicollis (Macleay, 1863)
 Temognatha flavicollis (Saunders, 1869)
 Temognatha flavocincta (Gory & Laporte, 1838)
 Temognatha flavomarginata (Gemminger & Harold, 1869)
 Temognatha fortnumii (Hope, 1843)
 Temognatha franca (Carter, 1916)
 Temognatha fusca (Saunders, 1871)
 Temognatha gemmelli (Deuquet, 1947)
 Temognatha gigas (Carter, 1916)
 Temognatha gloriosa (Carter, 1916)
 Temognatha gordonburnsi Barker, 1993
 Temognatha goryi (Gory & Laporte, 1838)
 Temognatha grandis (Donovan, 1805)
 Temognatha haematica (Hope, 1846)
 Temognatha heros Géhin, 1855
 Temognatha imperialis (Carter, 1916)
 Temognatha jakobsoni (Obenberger, 1928)
 Temognatha jansonii (Saunders, 1868)
 Temognatha latithorax (Thomson, 1857)
 Temognatha lessonii (Gory, 1841)
 Temognatha limbata (Donovan, 1805)
 Temognatha lobicollis (Saunders, 1868)
 Temognatha macfarlani (Waterhouse, 1881)
 Temognatha maculiventris (Macleay, 1863)
 Temognatha marcida (Blackburn, 1892)
 Temognatha marginalis (Carter, 1929)
 Temognatha martinii (Saunders, 1869)
 Temognatha menalcas (Thomson, 1879)
 Temognatha miranda (Carter, 1927)
 Temognatha mitchellii (Hope, 1846)
 Temognatha mnizechii (Saunders, 1868)
 Temognatha murrayi (Gemminger & Harold, 1869)
 Temognatha nickerli (Obenberger, 1922)
 Temognatha nigrofasciata (Théry, 1937)
 Temognatha obesissima (Thomson, 1879)
 Temognatha obscuripennis (Mannerheim, 1837)
 Temognatha oleata (Blackburn, 1894)
 Temognatha parvicollis (Saunders, 1869)
 Temognatha pascoei (Saunders, 1868)
 Temognatha pictipes (Blackburn, 1894)
 Temognatha pubicollis (Waterhouse, 1874)
 Temognatha punctatostriata (Saunders, 1868)
 Temognatha rectipennis (Blackburn, 1891)
 Temognatha regia (Blackburn, 1892)
 Temognatha reichei (Gory & Laporte, 1838)
 Temognatha rubra (Théry, 1937)
 Temognatha rufocyanea (Carter, 1916)
 Temognatha sanguinea (Saunders, 1869)
 Temognatha sanguineocincta (Saunders, 1868)
 Temognatha sanguinipennis (Gory & Laporte, 1838)
 Temognatha sanguiniventris (Saunders, 1868)
 Temognatha secularis (Thomson, 1857)
 Temognatha sexmaculata (Saunders, 1868)
 Temognatha similis (Saunders, 1868)
 Temognatha spencii (Gory & Laporte, 1838)
 Temognatha stevensii Gehin, 1855
 Temognatha suturalis (Donovan, 1805)
 Temognatha thoracica (Saunders, 1868)
 Temognatha tricolorata (Waterhouse, 1874)
 Temognatha variabilis (Donovan, 1805)
 Temognatha viridescens Barker, 1995
 Temognatha viridicincta (Waterhouse, 1874)
 Temognatha vitticollis (Macleay, 1863)
 Temognatha westwoodii (Saunders, 1868)
 Temognatha wimmerae (Blackburn, 1890)

References

External links
 Hawkeswood, T. J. (2008). Review of the larval host plants and biology for fifteen species of the genus Temognatha Solier, 1833 (Coleoptera: Buprestidae). Calodema Supplementary Paper No. 71. 
Jewel Beetle (Temognatha alternata) OzAnimals.com Australian Wildlife.

Buprestidae genera
Beetles of Australia